Tareythang Gewog (Dzongkha: རྟ་རས་ཐང་) is a gewog (village block) of Sarpang District, Bhutan.

References

Gewogs of Bhutan
Sarpang District